Kamembe International Airport, is an airport in Rwanda. RwandAir operates a Dash 8-Q400 with seven flights per week to and from Kigali International Airport. The airport receives charter flights from Tanzania, Uganda and the Democratic Republic of the Congo, though not on a regular schedule. During the Rwandan Civil War, Kamembe airport was suggested as a site for transiting French arms to the interim government after April 1994.

Location
The geographical coordinates of Kamembe Airport are:
02°27'23.0"S, 28°54'35.0"E (Latitude:-2.456389; Longitude:28.909722).

Overview

History
The airport terminal building was heavily damaged by a 2008 earthquake, and early in 2010 the Rwanda government announced that Kamembe Airport would be repaired and modernized.

By the end of 2012 a new terminal was completed, a new control tower was opened, and  Techno Sky, a branch of the Italian publicly owned ENAV corporation, had installed new navigation systems.

The airport re-opened in June 2015 and RwandAir began scheduled flights from the airport.

Airlines and destinations

References

External links
 Rwandair resumes Nairobi flights after two weeks lapse As of 8 December 2009.

Cyangugu
Airports in Rwanda
Western Province, Rwanda